Judy Takács (born 1962, New York) is a contemporary figurative painter, known for her realistic paintings from her ongoing, traveling portrait series, Chicks with Balls: Judy Takács paints unsung female heroes. “Takács is a figurative artist who tells stories about people who have something uplifting to share.” She is an elected member of, and past Social Media Chair for Allied Artists of America. She is past Social Media Chair and Literature Committee writer for the Cecilia Beaux Forum of the Portrait Society of America. In 2018, Takács was elected to membership in the Salmagundi Art Club and the Catharine Lorillard Wolfe Art Club in New York City.  She holds Signature Status with American Women Artists and Akron Society of Artists.  She lives and works in Solon, Ohio.

Biography
Takács received her BFA in Illustration and Portrait Painting from the Cleveland Institute of Art in 1986. Takács has staged serial projects painting senior citizens and elderly nuns from life. These projects have yielded over fifty paintings, three solo shows,  a feature in Anthropology & Aging Quarterly and placements in juried and invitational shows. In 2014 she published a book of these collected portraits of the elderly called, The Age of Adventure.

In 2009 she began both painting and blogging her project; Chicks with Balls: Judy Takács paints unsung female heroes. For this series, she asked her female friends and family to pose topless, holding balls to symbolize their personal challenges. In 2013, Takács authored and published, Chicks with Balls: Judy Takács paints unsung female heroes. and received an Ohio Arts Council Grant for Individual Artistic Excellence for the series which became a traveling exhibition.

Takács' work has been recognized by the Portrait Society of America, the Art Renewal Center,  the National Arts Club, Cincinnati Arts Club, Allied Artists of America, Catharine Lorillard Wolfe Club, and the Salmagundi Club, NYC. She has participated in Women Painting Women Exhibitions along with Rachel Constantine, Alia El-Bermani, Diane Fiesel and Sadie Valeri, and multiple Poets/Artists publications and live exhibitions. Takács' work is archived at the Artists Archives of the Western Reserve. Her work has been exhibited at the Butler Institute of American Art, the Zanesville Museum of Art, Evansville Museum, Museum of Contemporary Art Cleveland, Haggin Museum and ARTneo. Takács' work is included in the permanent collections of Susquehanna University and ARTneo.

In 2014, Takács curated Majority Rising for the Artists Archives of the Western Reserve during Women's History Month. Choosing work from Cleveland figurative artists, Shirley Aley Campbell, Kathleen McKenna, Marilyn Szalay, Lee Heinen and Marsha Sweet. Takács painted and exhibited a portrait of each artist as well.

In 2016 Takács was one of the nine artists, including Stephanie Deshpande, Lauren Tilden, Mario Robinson, and Terry Strickland, who participated in the Emanuel Nine Portrait Project at Principle Gallery, honoring the victims of the Charleston church shooting. She painted a portrait of Rev. Dr. Daniel Simmons Sr.

In 2018 Takács had her two-artist inaugural exhibition with the late Marilyn Szalay at the Artists Archives of the Western Reserve. Takács and Szalay were referred to as “two titans of figurative art” in Cleveland Scene Magazine. The exhibition showed 12 works from each artist and was entitled, "Szalay…Takács…Secrets." The theme for the works included dealt with the concept of hidden meanings in art, some of which go to the grave with the artist.

Takács is past chair of the New Media Relations sub-committee of the Portrait Society of America Cecilia Beaux Forum, and past Social Media Chair for the Allied Artists of America.

Takács' father is Queueing theory pioneer, Lajos Takács and her mother, is the author Dalma Takács.

Art

Takács' painting, Cancer Honeymoon depicts Takács’ mother, Dalma Takács during the early stages of ovarian cancer. She continues this theme with her paintings, Guardian Angel of the Good Death and Serenity Prayer and the Ephemera Collector Series.

Greed: Guarded Idealist, 2013 Best of Show winner at the Chagrin Valley Art Center Annual Juried Show is inspired by the concept of the Seven deadly sins as human traits necessary for survival. This work portrays “Greed” as the guardian and protector of ones artistic vision and idealism.

Kim, the Keeper of Time is from Takács’ Chicks with Balls series. Jewelry artist, Kim Mettee chose alpaca yarn balls and demonstrated the meditative process of rolling them as she posed.

Bibliography

Beautiful Bizarre Magazine, March 2021, Issue 32, Judy Takács and Shana Levenson: Artist to Artist, Armidale, Australia
The Artists Magazine, September 2018, A Happy Medium: Judy Takács, Grand Prize Winner in the All Media Art Competition, F-W Media, Inc., Cincinnati, Ohio
Poets/Artists Sight Unseen, February 2016, Didi Menendez, with curator Alia El-Bermani, Poets/Artists, Chicago, Illinois
The Archives Speak, November 2014, Rota Sackerlotzky and Roger Welchans, The Artists Archives of the Western Reserve, Cleveland, Ohio
Age of Adventure: Judy Takács paints the retired and inspired, August 2014, Judy Takács, blurb.com, Cleveland, Ohio
Women Painting Women, September 2014. Matter Deep Publishing, Principle Gallery, South Carolina
Art Renewal Center International Salon Catalog 2013/14. August 2014
Present Tense: Contemporary Art in Ohio, Artists of Rubber CIty. November 2014.
Manifest Gallery International Painting Annual 3. January 2014. Manifest Gallery, Cincinnati, Ohio
Chicks with Balls: Judy Takács paints unsung female heroes, August 2013, blurb.com
Solon Senior Project: Judy Takács paints fascinating wisdom, November 2012, blurb.com

See also
 The Kitsch Movement
 Post-contemporary
 Contemporary Realism

References

External links

 Artist Portfolio and Website
 Cleveland Scene Magazine Article by Joseph Clark
 Sankofa Review Article by Gabriella Dellosso Gonzales
 Cleveland Plain Dealer Newspaper Article by Steven Litt
 Television Interview on "Artists at Work"
 Film of Gallery Show, Chicks with Balls: Judy Takács paints unsung female heroes at Cuyahoga Community College Gallery East

1962 births
Living people
American contemporary painters
21st-century American painters
Artists from Cleveland
American women painters
20th-century American painters
Modern painters
Cleveland Institute of Art alumni
American portrait painters
Artists from Ohio
20th-century American women artists
21st-century American women artists